The Vulture Wally may refer to:

 The Vulture Wally (1921 film), German silent film
 The Vulture Wally (1940 film), German film
 The Vulture Wally (1956 film), German film